The 2000 Commonwealth Youth Games, officially known as the I Commonwealth Youth Games, and commonly known as Edinburgh 2000, a regional sporting event that was held from 10 to 14 August 2000 in the Scottish capital of Edinburgh.

Sports
The following sports were included in the 2000 games:

Medal count
This is the full table of the medal count of these Games. These rankings sort by the number of gold medals earned by a country. The number of silvers is taken into consideration next and then the number of bronze. If, after the above, countries are still tied, equal ranking is given and they are listed alphabetically. This follows the system used by the IOC, IAAF and BBC.

External links

2000
Commonwealth Youth Games
Commonwealth Youth Games
August 2000 sports events in the United Kingdom
Youth sport in Scotland
Multi-sport events in the United Kingdom
2000s in Edinburgh
International sports competitions in Edinburgh
2000 in youth sport